Cochliomyia hominivorax, the New World screw-worm fly, or screw-worm for short, is a species of parasitic fly that is well known for the way in which its larvae (maggots) eat the living tissue of warm-blooded animals. It is present in the New World tropics. There are five species of Cochliomyia but only one species of screw-worm fly in the genus is parasitic; there is also a single Old World species in a different genus (Chrysomya bezziana). Infestation of a live vertebrate animal by a maggot is technically called myiasis. While the maggots of many fly species eat dead flesh, and may occasionally infest an old and putrid wound, screw-worm maggots are unusual because they attack healthy tissue.

Life cycle
Screw-worm females lay 250–500 eggs in the exposed flesh of warm-blooded animals, including humans, such as in wounds and the navels of newborn animals. The larvae hatch and burrow into the surrounding tissue as they feed. Should the wound be disturbed during this time, the larvae burrow or "screw" deeper into the flesh, thus the insect's name. The maggots are capable of causing severe tissue damage or even death to the host. About three to seven days after hatching, the larvae fall to the ground to pupate. The pupae reach the adult stage about seven days later. Female screw-worm flies mate four to five days after hatching. The entire lifecycle is around 20 days. A female can lay up to 3,000 eggs and fly up to  during her life.

Control
The United States officially eradicated the screw-worm in 1982 using the sterile insect technique. However, a 2016 outbreak occurred in Monroe County, Florida. The screw-worm was eradicated in Guatemala and Belize in 1994, El Salvador in 1995, and Honduras in 1996. Campaigns against the flies continue in Mexico, Nicaragua, Costa Rica, Panama, and Jamaica with financial assistance from the United States Department of Agriculture, which tries to push back the parasite beyond the narrow and easily controlled Isthmus of Panama.

Etymology
From the Greek kochlias (snail with a spiral shell) + myia (fly) and the Latin hominis (man) + vorax (consuming), Cochliomyia hominivorax, or the New World screw-worm fly (formerly Callitroga (Greek kallos, (beautiful), + trogein, (to gnaw), americana), was first described by French entomologist Charles Coquerel in 1858.

In popular culture
The 1977 science fiction story "The Screwfly Solution" imagines aliens exterminating humans in a similar fashion. In Carmen Mola's detective novel La novia gitana (2018), and in The Dante Club (2003) by Matthew Pearl,  Cochliomyia hominivorax is used as a murder weapon by introducing eggs or larvae into the body of an intended victim. In the television series BrainDead (2016), an extraterrestrial version of the screw-worm causes the hosts to become overzealous about their politics and health.

References

Further reading 

 James, Maurice T. (1947) The Flies That Cause Myiasis in Man. USDA Miscellaneous Publication No. 631.

External links
Species Profile - Screwworm (Cochliomyia hominivorax), National Invasive Species Information Center, United States National Agricultural Library.
Invasive Species Compendium, CAB International

Calliphoridae
Diptera of South America
Veterinary entomology
Parasitic flies
Insects described in 1858
Taxa named by Charles Coquerel